Khoirunnisa, (born 23 May 1999) known as Nissa Sabyan, is an Indonesian singer who is a member Sabyan Gambus as a vocalist. 
Nissa is known to public for often singing (cover) songs with Islamic nuances or prophet salawat. The video clip has been watched millions of times and is often trending on YouTube.

Career

Beginnings 
Nissa Sabyan was born in Lumajang and lived in Bandung until 6th grade of primary school then moved to Jakarta. After graduating from junior high school, Nissa entered vocational high school.

From there, Nissa, who was just 19 years old in 2018, aspires to continue studying in the music major. But now Nissa wants to focus on her music group first.

Sabyan Gambus 
Sabyan Gambus began to be known to public because it often brings Islamic songs or prophet's prayer, either by re-singing (cover) or singing new works. Sabyan Gambus consisting of several former Islamic boarding school students based in Jakarta.

Sabyan Gambus was made originally for weddings. The most popular collection of salawat songs is Nissa Sabyan, including Ya Maulana, Deen Assalam, Ya Jamalu, Law Kana Bainanal Habib, Ya Habibal Qolbi, Rahman ya Rahman, Ya Asyiqol Musthofa, Ahmad Ya Habibi, Ya Taiba, Qomarun, Assalamualaika ya Rasulullah, and others.

Controversies 
In February 2021, it was rumored that Nissa and Ayus, the keyboardist of  Sabyan Gambus, had an affair. This issue shocked the public and was widely reported to Ririe Fairus, Ayus' wife. Ririe then went to the North Jakarta Religious Court. After keeping quiet from the media, on Sunday, February 21, 2021, Ayus made a 30-second video statement apologising to all parties for his mistake.

Filmography

Film

Awards

See Also 
 Sara Fajira
 Stephanie Poetri

References

External links 

1999 births
Living people
21st-century Indonesian women singers
Performers of Islamic music
Indonesian film actresses
Indonesian television actresses
Universal Music Group artists